Crothaema is a genus of moths in the family Limacodidae.

Species
Some species of this genus are:

Crothaema conspicua Janse, 1964
Crothaema decorata Distant, 1892
Crothaema flava Berio, 1940
Crothaema gloriosa Hering, 1928
Crothaema mormopis Meyrick, 1934
Crothaema ornata Romieux, 1934
Crothaema schoutedeni Hering, 1954
Crothaema sericea Butler, 1880
Crothaema trichromata West, 1937

References

Butler, A. G. 1880b. On a collection of Lepidoptera from Madagascar with descriptions of new genera and species. - Annals and Magazine of Natural History (5)5:333–344, 384–395.

Limacodidae genera
Limacodidae
Taxa named by Arthur Gardiner Butler

Limacodinae